Everts Air  is an American airline based in Fairbanks, Alaska, United States. It operates scheduled and charter airline cargo as well as passenger services within Alaska and Canada. Its main base is Fairbanks International Airport with its major hub at Ted Stevens Anchorage International Airport.  The company slogan is Legendary Aircraft. Extraordinary Service.

History 
A family-owned business run by Robert W. Everts who created Tatonduk Flying Service in 1977 with a  single Cessna 180 aircraft to provide air transportation for miners in the remote places of Alaska. Since 1980, his father, Clifford R. Everts, has owned and operated Everts Air Fuel Inc., which specializes in airlifting flammable and hazardous materials.

In 1993 the airline, originally Federal Aviation Regulations Part 135 certified (Commuter and On-Demand Operations), became FAR Part 121 certified (Domestic, Flag, and Supplemental Operations) as Tatonduk Outfitters Limited purchased Everts Air. With the introduction of larger aircraft like the Douglas DC-6B and Curtiss-Wright C-46 Commando the company split between Everts Air Alaska and Everts Air Cargo.

Operating the Douglas DC-6

Since Northern Air Cargo abandoned their regular service with the Douglas DC-6, Everts Air Cargo is the last airline in the United States to operate scheduled flights with a rather large fleet of 60-year-old piston-powered aircraft. In a 2007 video interview, the Anchorage Station Manager stated that the DC-6 was still considered to be a valuable aircraft for operations in the harsh conditions of Alaska, with excellent landing and takeoff performance on gravel runways. The downside is the difficulty to find Avgas and the maintenance labor cost. Everts Air Cargo estimates a ratio of 12 hours of maintenance for every single flying hour. Spare parts could also be a problem but Everts Air Cargo anticipates they will have enough in stock to keep the last DC-6 flying beyond 2020.

Zero Gravity Corporation Boeing 727 
Since 2015 Everts Air has operated a Boeing 727-227F for the Zero Gravity Corporation (also known as ZERO-G), which previously operated with Amerijet International. The aircraft is based in the Contiguous United States and operates weightless flights. Unlike NASA, ZERO-G is governed under Part 121 of FAA regulations, enabling the company to cater to both tourists and researchers alike.

Destinations
 Everts Air operates scheduled freight and passengers services to the following domestic destinations:

 Allakaket (AET) - Allakaket Airport
 Anaktuvuk Pass (AKP) - Anaktuvuk Pass Airport
 Anchorage (ANC) - Ted Stevens Anchorage International Airport (hub)
 Aniak (ANI) - Aniak Airport
 Arctic Village (ARC) - Arctic Village Airport
 Barrow (BRW) - Wiley Post–Will Rogers Memorial Airport
 Beaver (WBQ) - Beaver Airport
 Bethel (BET) - Bethel Airport
 Bettles (BTT) - Bettles Airport
 Dillingham (DLG) - Dillingham Airport
 Eagle (EAA) - Eagle Airport
 Emmonak (EMK) - Emmonak Airport
 Fairbanks (FAI) - Fairbanks International Airport (hub)
 Fort Yukon (FYU) - Fort Yukon Airport
 Galena (GAL) - Edward G. Pitka Sr. Airport
 Iliamna (ILI) - Iliamna Airport
 King Salmon (AKN) - King Salmon Airport (hub)
 Kotzebue (OTZ) - Ralph Wien Memorial Airport
 Lake Minchumina (MHM/LMA) - Minchumina Airport
 Nome (OME) - Nome Airport
 Prudhoe Bay (SCC) - Deadhorse Airport
 St. Mary's (KSM) - St. Mary's Airport
 Unalakleet (UNK) - Unalakleet Airport
 Venetie (VEE) - Venetie Airport

Fleet 

 Everts Air fleet includes:

 2 Air Tractor AT-802 configured to carry fuel for Everts Air Fuel operations
 1 Boeing 727-227F operated for Zero Gravity Corporation
 1 Cessna 180
 1 Cessna 206H
 1 Cessna C208B Grand Caravan
 1 Curtiss-Wright C-46D
 1 Curtiss-Wright C-46F
 2 Curtiss-Wright C-46R
 6 Douglas DC-6A
 2 Douglas DC-6B
 2 Douglas DC-9-32F
 6 Douglas DC-9-33F
 2 Douglas DC-9-41
 7 Douglas C-118A 
 3 Embraer EMB 120 Brasilia
 2 McDonnell Douglas MD-82
 6 McDonnell Douglas MD-83
 2 Pilatus PC-12/47
 2 Piper PA-32R-300

Twelve of the above aircraft (two DC-9, two MD-80, seven DC-6 and one C-46) are inactive or in storage.

In July 2020 Everts Air Cargo acquired six Cessna 208 at Ravn Alaska's bankruptcy auction.

References

External links 

 Everts Air

Airlines based in Alaska
Cargo airlines of the United States
Airlines established in 1978
Regional airlines of the United States
Companies based in Fairbanks, Alaska
1978 establishments in Alaska
American companies established in 1978